Cunliffe-Owen is a surname, and may refer to:

 Sir Philip Cunliffe-Owen (1828–1894), English exhibition organizer and museum director
 Sir Hugo Cunliffe-Owen (1870–1947), English tobacco industrialist 
 Frederick Cunliffe-Owen (1855-1926), British-born American journalist
 Cunliffe-Owen baronets, a title in the Baronetage of the United Kingdom created in 1920 for Hugo Cunliffe-Owen

See also
 Cunliffe-Owen Aircraft, a British aircraft manufacturer of the World War II era founded by Hugo Cunliffe-Owen